The 1994 Virginia Slims of Chicago was a women's tennis tournament played on indoor carpet courts at the UIC Pavilion in Chicago, Illinois in the United States that was part of Tier II of the 1994 WTA Tour. It was the 23rd edition of the tournament and was held from February 7 through February 13, 1994. Second-seeded Natasha Zvereva won the singles title and earned $80,000 first-prize money.

Finals

Singles

 Natasha Zvereva defeated  Chanda Rubin 6–3, 7–5
 It was Zvereva's 2nd title of the year and the 45th of her career.

Doubles

 Gigi Fernández /  Natasha Zvereva defeated  Manon Bollegraf /  Martina Navratilova 6–3, 3–6, 6–4
 It was Fernández's 2nd title of the year and the 46th of her career. It was Zvereva's 3rd title of the year and the 46th of her career.

Prize money 

* per team

External links
 International Tennis Federation (ITF) tournament edition details
 Tournament draws

Virginia Slims of Chicago
Ameritech Cup
1994 in sports in Illinois
February 1994 sports events in the United States
1994 in American tennis